Carolina Blues is a 1944 American comedy film directed by Leigh Jason and written by Joseph Hoffman, Al Martin and Jack Henley. The film stars Kay Kyser, Ann Miller, Victor Moore, Jeff Donnell, Howard Freeman, Georgia Carroll, M.A. Bogue, Harry Babbitt and Sully Mason. The film was released on December 20, 1944, by Columbia Pictures.

Plot
Kay Kyser (Kay Kyser) and his band get back to North Carolina after a long USO visit. Rather than taking a rest, the band plays at a close by shipyard. There, Kay meets Julie Carver (Ann Miller), a fabulous vocalist whom Kay botches for the shipyard proprietor's little girl. Kay's standard vocalist, Georgia Carroll (Georgia Carroll), needs Julie to fill in for her so she can leave the band and get hitched. Kay concurs simply after Julie can bait a well off comparative with their show.

Cast          
Kay Kyser as Kay Kyser
Ann Miller as Julie Carver
Victor Moore as Phineas / Elliott / Hiriam / Horatio / Aunt Martha / Aunt Minerva Carver
Jeff Donnell as Charlotte Barton
Howard Freeman as Tom Gordon
Georgia Carroll as Georgia Carroll
M.A. Bogue as Ish Kabibble 
Harry Babbitt as Harry Babbitt
Sully Mason as Sully Mason
Harold Nicholas as Dance Specialty
Marie Bryant as Dancer in 'Mr. Beebe'
Elvia Allman as Loud Kyser Fan
June Richmond as Singer in 'Mr. Beebe' Number

References

External links
 

1944 films
American comedy films
1944 comedy films
Columbia Pictures films
Films directed by Leigh Jason
American black-and-white films
1940s English-language films
1940s American films